Creative Nonfiction is a literary magazine based in Pittsburgh, Pennsylvania, United States. The journal was founded by Lee Gutkind in 1993, making it the first literary magazine to publish, exclusively and on a regular basis, high quality nonfiction prose. In Spring 2010, Creative Nonfiction evolved from journal to magazine format with the addition of new sections such as writer profiles and essays on the craft of writing, as well as updates on developments in the literary non-fiction scene.

Work originally printed in Creative Nonfiction has been reprinted in The Best American Essays, The Best American Travel Writing in 2013, The Best Women's Travel Writing in 2013, and The Best American Nonrequired Reading. In 2014, Creative Nonfiction ranked 23 on the Pushcart Prize list of nonfiction literary magazines. Creative Nonfiction was a finalist for the 2014 AWP Small Press Publisher Award and a finalist in the "Best Writing" category for the Utne Independent Press Award in 2011.



Past issues

Past contributors 

Diane Ackerman
Jane Alison
Roger Angell
Jane Bernstein 
Frank Deford
Annie Dillard
Andre Dubus
Stefan Fatsis
Beth Ann Fennelly
Carolyn Forché
Ellen Gilchrist
Meredith Hall
Sonya Huber

Heidi Julavits
Shawna Kenney
Lawrence Krauss
Erik Larson (author)
Gordon Lish
Phillip Lopate
Bret Lott
Hilary Masters
Todd May
Bill McKibben

John McPhee
Philip Metres
Dinty W. Moore
Daniel Nester
Stewart O'Nan
Chris Offutt
Linda Peeno
George Plimpton
Francine Prose
Adrienne Rich
Ruthann Robson
Elizabeth Rush

Richard Rodriguez
Heather Sellers
David Shields
Charles Simic
Floyd Skloot
Rebecca Skloot
Lauren Slater
Gay Talese
John Edgar Wideman
C.K. Williams
Terry Tempest Williams

CNF books

The Creative Nonfiction Foundation 

The Creative Nonfiction Foundation pursues educational and publishing initiatives in the genre of literary nonfiction. Its objectives are to provide a venue, the journal Creative Nonfiction, for high quality nonfiction prose (memoir, literary journalism, personal essay); to serve as the singular strongest voice of the genre, defining the ethics and parameters of the field; and to broaden the genre's impact in the literary arena by providing an array of educational services and publishing activities.

The Creative Nonfiction Foundation was incorporated in 1994 and is a private not-for-profit 501(c)(3) organization supported by public and private funds contributed by the Pennsylvania Council on the Arts, the Juliet Lea Hillman Simonds Foundation, the Vira I. Heinz Endowment, and the Jewish Healthcare Foundation, as well as by individual donors.

Educational programs 

The Creative Nonfiction Foundation offers a number of educational programs for teachers, students, and emerging writers.

Mentoring programs
Creative Nonfiction's mentoring program pairs new writers with seasoned professionals such as Rebecca Skloot and Dinty W. Moore. The mentoring program's goal is to help new writers: 1) develop their technique and approach to creative nonfiction composition; 2) revise, edit and shape their manuscript; and 3) place their finished manuscript with a publisher.

Online courses
Creative Nonfiction provides online courses on basic techniques for research, interviewing, immersion, and reporting as well as instruction on writing personal essays.

Writers' conferences
CNF hosted the Mid-South Conference in Oxford, Mississippi, in February 2008, and 412: The Pittsburgh Creative Nonfiction Literary Festival in 2004, 2005, 2006, and 2008. In the spring of 2013, Creative Nonfiction hosted The Best of Creative Nonfiction Conference at the Pittsburgh Cultural Trust Arts Education Center in Pittsburgh, Pennsylvania. Creative Nonfiction also hosts an annual Creative Nonfiction Writers' Conference, dedicated to the art, craft, and power of true stories, each May.

Writing institutes
Creative Nonfiction holds institutes throughout the year in a variety of locations and offers programs for writers at all levels of experience. Instructors include Lee Gutkind and other well-known writers, teachers, and editors. The institutes often cover a range of themes, from the basics of the creative nonfiction genre to writing memoir to travel narrative. Courses also attempt to emphasize the ethics and guidelines of the genre.

Editorial advisory board 
A number of prominent authors, educators and media figures are members of the Foundation's Editorial Advisory Board, whose task is to help the Editorial Board sustain and guide the editorial mission of the magazine.

 Diane Ackerman
 Buzz Bissinger
 Edwidge Danticat
 Annie Dillard
 Dave Eggers

 Jonathan Franzen
 Tracy Kidder
 Rick Moody
 Susan Orlean
 Francine Prose

 Ruth Reichl
 Richard Rodriguez
 Rebecca Skloot
 Gay Talese

See also
Tinpahar
Harper's Magazine

External links 
 The Creative Nonfiction website
 Lee Gutkind's Website
 Brevity: A Journal of Concise Literary Nonfiction
 Creative Nonfiction on LitList

1993 establishments in Pennsylvania
Literary magazines published in the United States
Quarterly magazines published in the United States
Magazines published in Pittsburgh
Magazines established in 1993